The 1885 New South Wales colonial election was for 122 members representing 72 electoral districts. The election was conducted on the basis of a simple majority or first-past-the-post voting system. In this election there were 35 multi-member districts returning 85 members and 37 single member districts giving a total of 122 members. In the multi-member districts each elector could vote for as many candidates as there were vacancies. 7 districts were uncontested. There was no recognisable party structure at this election. The average number of enrolled voters per seat was 1,831, ranging from East Maitland (1,018) to Canterbury (2,630).

Election results

Albury

Argyle

The sitting member Sir Henry Parkes successfully contested St Leonards.

Balmain

| colspan="2"   |  
	| colspan="2" style="text-align:center;" | (1 new seat)

The other sitting member William Hutchinson did not contest the election.

Balranald

Bathurst

The Bogan

Boorowa

Bourke

Braidwood

Angus Cameron was a sitting member for West Sydney however he had been defeated for that seat on Tuesday 13 October.

Camden

Canterbury

| colspan="2"   |  
	| colspan="2" style="text-align:center;" | (1 new seat)

Carcoar

The other sitting member George Campbell did not contest the election.

The Clarence

Central Cumberland

| colspan="2"   |  
	| colspan="2" style="text-align:center;" | (1 new seat)

Durham

East Macquarie

The other sitting member Edward Combes did not contest the election.

East Maitland

East Sydney

Eden

Forbes

The Glebe

| colspan="2"   |  
	| colspan="2" style="text-align:center;" | (1 new seat)

Glen Innes

Gloucester

Goulburn

Grafton

Grenfell

Gundagai

The sitting member James Watson did not contest the election.

Gunnedah

The Gwydir

Thomas Dangar was the sitting member for The Namoi.

Hartley

The Hastings and Manning

The Hawkesbury

The Hume

The other sitting member Leyser Levin did not contest the election.

The Hunter

Illawarra

The sitting member Alexander Stuart did not contest the election.

Inverell

Kiama

The Macleay

Molong

Monaro

The sitting members Septimus Badgery and David Ryrie did not contest the election. Thomas O'Mara was the sitting member for Tumut.

Morpeth

Mudgee

The other sitting member David Buchanan did not contest the election.

The Murray

The Murrumbidgee

| colspan="2"   |  
	| colspan="2" style="text-align:center;" | (1 new seat)

The sitting members Auber Jones and George Loughnan did not contest the election. George Dibbs was the Premier and a member for St Leonards where he was successfully challenged by Sir Henry Parkes on Friday 16 October.

The Namoi

The sitting member Thomas Dangar unsuccessfully contested The Gwydir.

The Nepean

Newcastle

New England

The sitting member James Farnell was appointed to the Legislative Council and did not contest the election.

Newtown

| colspan="2"   |  
	| colspan="2" style="text-align:center;" | (1 new seat)

Northumberland

Joseph Gorrick was the sitting member for Wollombi.

Orange

Paddington

Parramatta

Patrick's Plains

Queanbeyan

The sitting member George De Salis did not contest the election.

Redfern

The other sitting member Alfred Fremlin did not contest the election.

The Richmond

| colspan="2"   |  
	| colspan="2" style="text-align:center;" | (1 new seat)

The sitting member Samuel Gray did not contest the election

Shoalhaven

South Sydney

The other sitting member John Harris did not contest the election.

St Leonards

Sir Henry Parkes was the member for Argyle who contested St Leonards to successfully challenge the Premier George Dibbs. Dibbs was returned to Parliament by successfully contesting The Murrumbidgee on Saturday 31 October.

Tamworth

Tenterfield

Tumut

The sitting member Thomas O'Mara unsuccessfully contested Monaro.

The Upper Hunter

The other sitting member John McLaughlin did not contest the election.

Wellington

Wentworth

| colspan="2"   |  
	| colspan="2" style="text-align:center;" | (1 new seat)

West Macquarie

West Maitland

The sitting member Henry Cohen did not contest the election.

West Sydney

Wollombi

The sitting member Joseph Gorrick unsuccessfully contested Northumberland.

Yass Plains

Young

See also 

 Candidates of the 1885 New South Wales colonial election
 Members of the New South Wales Legislative Assembly, 1885–1887

References 

1885